Mark Hodder is an English author, since 2008 living in Spain. His six-part series of 'Burton & Swinburne' steampunk novels opened with The Strange Affair of Spring-Heeled Jack, which went on to win the 2010 Philip K. Dick Award. The following two novels, The Curious Case of the Clockwork-Man and Expedition to the Mountains of the Moon, were released in 2011 and 2012 respectively to wide acclaim from fans of the genre, with the latter nominated for a Sidewise Award.
His fourth novel in the Burton & Swinburne series, The Secret of Abdu El Yezdi, was also nominated for a Sidewise Award.

The standalone novel, A Red Sun Also Rises, released in December 2012, transplants a version of Victorian London to another planet.

In 2015, Hodder began writing a new series set in the far future, called The Oxford Equation.

Hodder is a noted enthusiast for the character of Sexton Blake.  He was an advisor to several reprint volumes of Blake stories, and the author of the first book in the relaunched sixth series of the Sexton Blake Library, 'The Silent Thunder Caper'.

Bibliography

Novels
 
 

Burton & Swinburne series
 
 
 
 
 
  (published August 2015)

Short fiction 
 "Blood of the Land" in

Critical studies and reviews of Hodder's work
A red sun also rises

Notes

External links

Hodder's website dedicated to Sexton Blake
Hodder's blog
Hodder's Twitter account

Year of birth missing (living people)
Living people
British emigrants to Spain
English science fiction writers
Steampunk writers
Authors of Sexton Blake